Szomolnokite (Fe2+SO4·H2O) is a monoclinic iron sulfate mineral forming a complete solid solution with magnesium end-member kieserite (MgSO4·H2O). In 1877 szomolnokite's name was derived by Joseph Krenner from its type locality of oxidized sulfide ore containing iron in Szomolnok, Slovakia (Hungary at the time).

As of mid-January 2020 the only continent on which szomolnokite has not been found and reported is Antarctica.

At room temperature szomolnokite is stable up to a pressure of 6.2 GPa, and then transforms into triclinic crystal structure.

References

Bibliography
Palache, P.; Berman H.; Frondel, C. (1960). "Dana's System of Mineralogy, Volume II: Halides, Nitrates, Borates, Carbonates, Sulfates, Phosphates, Arsenates, Tungstates, Molybdates, Etc. (Seventh Edition)" John Wiley and Sons, Inc., New York, pp. 479–480.

Sulfate minerals
Monoclinic minerals
Minerals in space group 15
Iron minerals